Sugar dating, also called sugaring, is a romantic, sexual relationship of an older wealthy person and a younger person. Payment can be received by way of money, gifts like designer goods, jewellery, support or other material benefits in exchange for companionship or a dating-like relationship. The person who receives the gifts is called a sugar baby (or in the case of men, traditionally a gigolo), while their paying partner is called a sugar daddy or sugar momma.

Sugar dating is especially popular in the online dating community due to the easy access to specific niches and desires.

Prevalence
The phenomenon of powerful men using their money to attract women is old. At the end of the 19th century, in a phenomenon known as "treating", women with low-paying jobs relied upon men to provide them with money in exchange for being an escort.

With the rising costs in tuition, cuts to scholarships and bursaries, as well as the increasing pressures of student debt, sugar dating has become prevalent among students. Research suggests that there is a growing phenomenon of female university students working in the sex industry to pay for their post-secondary education. Due to the nature and stigmatization of sex work in the marginalized and hidden population, there is limited information for the percentage of students participating in these types of relationships.  Those that decide to participate in sugar often use various websites to come in contact with these people. The websites that are used to negotiate sugar arrangements are technically dating sites and what happens after the initial date, whether involving sexual or other activities, is between the parties. Membership on one site in 2016 was $70 per month for sugar daddies or mommies, but free for sugar babies.

Social media impact 
As we look more in today's time, sugar dating has become a lot less informal. Platforms such as OnlyFans, Tinder and Instagram create easier access to sugaring relationships. Sugar dating has become so popular that some even use it as a scamming technique to exploit interests. People will advertise that they are offering money for a relationship in an effort to trick people into giving them personal information, such as their banking information.

Musical artists and other influencers also promote sugaring relationships and some forms of sex work with their platform. This can be seen in certain famous people, like Bella Thorne.

Legality and comparison to sex work 
There is debate about whether this practice can be considered sex work, i.e., purchase of intimate attention, sexual or otherwise. In an article from Deutsche Welle, the CEO of SeekingArrangement denied that the site played host to prostitutes and their customers, saying that "escorts and their clients are never welcome on our sites".

Typically sugar dating involves other activities around regular dating and romance, where sex may not necessary be a part of it. Most involved couples will have a verbal arrangement and do not make sex to be a requirement of this arrangement. For this reason it would be hard to prove that anyone was paid for sex, hence the practice is considered legal. If sexual activity is specially arranged in a relationship that involves payments, then it becomes illegal, but again proving it might be difficult unless there was a written contract.

In Malaysia, sugar dating is illegal, to the point where the CEO of Malaysian sugar dating company, Sugarbook, was arrested and their website URL blocked by Malaysian ISP's.

Sugaring has been called the modern-day counterpart of the 17th-century courtesan, "a prostitute, especially one with wealthy or upper-class clients."

Sugar dating sites were affected by the 2018 Stop Enabling Sex Traffickers Act passed by the U.S. Senate, which prompted the closure of many sugar dating sites operating in the U.S. This included Established Men, a sugar dating site owned by the parent company of Ashley Madison, Ruby Corp, and the personals section of Craigslist.

See also 

 Age disparity in sexual relationships
 Client (prostitution)
 Enjo kōsai
 Gigolo
 Girlfriend experience
 Gold digger
 MillionaireMatch
 Mistress (lover)
 Prostitution
 SeekingArrangement
 Sugarbook
 Transactional sex
 Treating (dating)
 Trophy wife

References 

Intimate relationships
Prostitution
Sexuality and age